Tayum, officially the Municipality of Tayum, is a 5th class municipality in the province of Abra, Philippines. According to the 2020 census, it has a population of 14,869 people.

According to the Philippine Statistics Authority, the municipality has a land area of  constituting  of the  total area of Abra.

Every 25 November, Tayum celebrates its town fiesta. Roman Catholicism is the dominant religion.

History

According to historical records, Tayum was named after the indigo plant, which the Ilocanos referred to as tayum-tayum. Indigo once flourished in Tayum, and it was a source of wealth for the Ilocanos. A big vat (pagtimbugan) was used in decaying the plant into a blue-black dye called "ngila" in Barangay Deet, about a half-kilometer away from the town proper. Cotton yams were dyed using the dye.

However, at the turn of the century, a powder dye from the Anilino Factories of Germany became popular among Ilocano weavers, effectively killing the indigo industry.

Tayum, also known as Bukaw, was founded in 1626 by an enterprising priest named Father Juan Pareja. Father Gabriel Alvarez, another equally daring and adventurous Augustinian Priest, built a temporary chapel in Tayum during his expedition to Lepanto in 1569. Tayum was formally organized as a political unit under the Spanish Regime in 1725. Don Vidal Banganan served as the first Gobernadorcillo.

With the construction of the solid bricks walled church under the successive Augustinian missions, Tayum transformed from a mere visita of Bangued into an independent mission in the year 1807. The church was built in honor of St. Catherine of Alexandria, whose feast day falls on November 25.

In 1904, Tayum reverted to a barrio of Bangued, due to the deterioration of peace and order at the time. Tayum's existence as a barrio came to an end on December 31, 1907, when Don Pio Balmaceda y Belmonte was appointed Teniente del barrio. Balmaceda organized his men to effectively curb lawlessness, restoring peace to the town. It regained its town status, with Don Manuel Brillantes as its first president.

On July 27, 2022, a magnitude 7.0 earthquake struck 3 km from the town. The quake killed at least eleven people and injured 567 others (19 of them in Tayum).

Barangays
Tayum is politically subdivided into 11 barangays. These barangays are headed by elected officials: Barangay Captain, Barangay Council, whose members are called Barangay Councilors. All are elected every three years.

Climate

Demographics

In the 2020 census, Tayum had a population of 14,869.

Economy

Government
Tayum, belonging to the lone congressional district of the province of Abra, is governed by a mayor designated as its local chief executive and by a municipal council as its legislative body in accordance with the Local Government Code. The mayor, vice mayor, and the councilors are elected directly by the people through an election which is being held every three years.

Elected officials

List of Cultural Properties of Tayum

|}

Transportation
The main mode of public transportation are tricycles and jeepneys.

See also
 Santa Catalina de Alejandria Parish Church

References

External links

 [ Philippine Standard Geographic Code]
 Municipality of Tayum

Municipalities of Abra (province)
Populated places on the Abra River